Juan Manuel Tolosa (born 22 September 1994) is an Argentine professional footballer who plays as a forward for Villa Belgrano.

Career
Tolosa's senior career began with Rivadavia in Torneo Argentino A. He got goals in both of his first two appearances in April 2013, netting on debut versus Defensores de Belgrano before netting a goal against Guillermo Brown. Eight appearances arrived in 2012–13, which was followed by thirty-two appearances in 2013–14; as he scored a further six goals, including braces over Cipolletti and Deportivo Maipú. The club were relegated to Torneo Federal B in 2013–14, as he subsequently appeared forty-six times and notched nineteen goals. In early 2016, Tolosa signed for Primera B Metropolitana's Atlanta. Twenty-seven games and one goal came.

July 2017 saw Tolosa return to Rivadavia, with the club back in the third tier; though they would suffer relegation again at the conclusion of 2017–18. Tolosa departed on 22 July 2018, agreeing terms with Colegiales. His bow occurred in the succeeding September versus Estudiantes. Twelve months later, Tolosa was on the move again as he joined Atlético Camioneros of Torneo Federal A.

Career statistics
.

References

External links

1994 births
Living people
Place of birth missing (living people)
Argentine footballers
Association football forwards
Torneo Argentino A players
Primera B Metropolitana players
Torneo Federal A players
Rivadavia de Lincoln footballers
Club Atlético Atlanta footballers
Club Atlético Colegiales (Argentina) players